Jamshed Ansari (31 December 1942 in Saharanpur – 24 August 2005 in Karachi) was a Pakistani film, television and radio actor. 

He is remembered for his numerous performances on both radio and television including Safdar in Hamid Mian Kay Haan and Hasnat Bhai on Uncle Urfi.

Background
Born in Saharanpur, United Provinces, British India (now in UP, India) on 31 December 1942, to the family of a business tycoon, Zamir Hasan Ansari. Dubai Islamic Bank is the brainchild of Jamshed's older brother Tamiz. Ansari migrated with his family to Pakistan in 1948.

In his early adulthood he moved to London, where he completed television production courses, worked in stage shows and with the BBC as well, returning to Pakistan in 1968, launching his acting career the same year.

Career

Radio
Ansari is remembered for his role as Safdar in Pakistan Radio's longest running programme, Hamid Mian Kay Haan (In Hamid Mian's house).

Television
Ansari made his debut in 1968 with Lahore Centre's drama, Jharokay. 

His first drama from Karachi Centre was Agha Nasir's  ("The horse eats grass").

He worked in more than 200 TV plays including some popular dramas such as Uncle Urfi, Ankahi, Tanhaiyaan, etc.

Death
Ansari died of a brain tumour on 24 August 2005. Funeral prayers were held at Baitul Mukarram Mosque, Gulshan-e-Iqbal, Karachi followed by burial at Khurshidpura Graveyard in Hub, Balochistan.

Awards
He was awarded 55 national and 2 international awards.

Selected filmography

Film

Television

See also
 List of Pakistani male actors

References

External links

2005 deaths
People from Saharanpur
Muhajir people
Pakistani male film actors
Pakistani male television actors
Pakistani male comedians
1942 births
Pakistani radio personalities
Radio personalities from Karachi
Male actors from Karachi
Deaths from brain cancer in Pakistan
20th-century comedians